Colbert Coldwell may refer to:
 Colbert Caldwell, also spelled Coldwell (1822–1892), a Justice of the Texas Supreme Court from 1867 to 1869
 Colbert Coldwell, founder of real estate firm Coldwell Banker and grandson of Colbert Coldwell (1822–1892)